During World War II, tens of thousands of Yugoslav citizens were imprisoned in Nazi concentration camps including more than 6,000 at Mauthausen and 20,000 in Auschwitz. At least 536 Yugoslav citizens were victims of Nazi human experimentation in the concentration camps.

References

Nazi concentration camps
Yugoslav prisoners in Nazi concentration camps
Axis war crimes in Yugoslavia